Los primeros siete annos is an album by Ensemble Renaissance, released in 1993 on the Edi Vox label in Spain. It is Renaissance's 12th album. The programme is separated in two parts - Medieval music and music of the Renaissance. It is a revision of their earliest works, recorded in the period of  1969-1976, before the material released on the LPs in the 80's. It was first released as audio cassette, but later it was re-issued on the CD. In the 2008 it was re-released in Serbia on the double disc edition under the name The First 15 years.
Some of the works performed on the disc are songs Cantigas de Santa Maria, a ballata by Francesco Landini and early organum from the Musica enchiriadis.

1993 albums
Ensemble Renaissance albums